Zameen Aasmaan is a 1972 Hindi action film directed by A. Veerappan. The music was composed by Kishore Kumar. It has the popular songs "Kisne Yahan Kisko Jaana", "Na Ro Aye Mere Dil", "Hum Tum Chale" and " Aankhen Tumhari Do Jahan".

Cast 
Ashok Kumar as Shanti Swaroop
Sunil Dutt as Ravi
Rekha as Kalpana
Yogeeta Bali as Roopa
Sharad Kumar as Ram
Indrani Mukherjee as Ganga / Maya (Double Role) 
Achala Sachdev as Hameeda
Dulari as Ganga
Ramesh Deo as Heeralal "Heera"

Soundtrack

References

External links 
 

1972 films
Indian action films
1970s Hindi-language films
1972 action films
Hindi-language action films